Sarah Jane Hatfield Krauser van Heerdt Higginson, Baroness van Heerdt ( – ) was an American author who published under the name S. J. Higginson. 

Her works include the lost race novel A Princess of Java: A Tale of the Far East (1887) and the travel book Java, the Pearl of the East (1890).

S. J. Higginson died on 21 March 1916 in New York City.

Personal life 

Her first marriage was to a man named Krauser and they had two children, Oscar and Florence.  On September 24, 1866, in Baltimore, Maryland, she married the Dutch jurist Jacob Carel Frederik, Baron van Heerdt (1819-1878).  They lived in the Dutch East Indies and had a son, who died young.   On May 15, 1874, in Brooklyn, New York, she married Stephen Higginson III, a coffee importer and diplomat.  They had one son, Stephen.

Bibliography 

 A Princess of Java: A Tale of the Far East (1887)
 Java, the Pearl of the East (1890)
 The Bedouin Girl (1894)

References 

  

Created via preloaddraft
1840 births
1916 deaths
American women writers